The 2022 Waterford Senior Hurling Championship was the 122nd staging of the Waterford Senior Hurling Championship since its establishment by the Waterford County Board in 1897. The draw for the group stage placing took place on 31 January 2022. The championship ran from 28 July to 11 September 2022.

Ballygunner entered the championship as the defending champions.

The final was played on 11 September 2022 at Walsh Park in Waterford, between Ballygunner and Mount Sion, in what was their 14th meeting in the final overall and a first meeting in the final in 8 years. Ballygunner won the match by 2-11 to 0-08 to claim their 21st championship title overall and a record-equalling ninth title in succession.

Tallow's Tomás Ryan was the championship's top scorer with 2-47.

Team changes

To Championship

Promoted from the Waterford Intermediate Hurling Championship
 Dunhill

From Championship

Relegated to the Waterford Intermediate Hurling Championship
 Ballyduff Upper
 Ballysaggart

Group A

Group A table

Group A results

Group B

Group B table

Group B results

Group C

Group C table

Group C results

Group D

Group D table

Group D results

Knockout stage

Preliminary quarter-finals

Relegation playoffs

Quarter-finals

Semi-finals

Final

Championship statistics

Top scorers

Overall

In a single game

References

Waterford Senior Hurling Championship
Waterford
Waterford Senior Hurling Championship